The CONCACAF League was an annual continental club football competition organized by CONCACAF as its second-tier continental competition. It was announced on 8 May 2017.

The competition uses a knockout cup format with each round having two legs. The top six teams proceed to the CONCACAF Champions League. From 2019 to 2022, the tournament featured 22 teams, an increase from 16 in the 2017 and 2018 editions.

The competition ended after the 2022 edition due to the expansion of the CONCACAF Champions League, starting with the 2024 edition. Two regional cup competitions – the Central American Cup and the Caribbean Cup – were created as qualifying competitions of the CONCACAF Champions League.

Qualification 
Since the 2019 edition, a total of 22 teams participate in the CONCACAF League: 18 from Central America (from 7 associations), 3 from the Caribbean (from 2 or 3 associations), and 1 from North America (from 1 association).

18 from the Central American Zone:
3 clubs from  Costa Rica
3 clubs from  El Salvador
3 clubs from  Guatemala
3 clubs from  Honduras
3 clubs from  Panama
2 clubs from  Nicaragua
1 club from  Belize

3 from the Caribbean Zone:
2 clubs from the Caribbean Club Championship (runner-up, third place)
Caribbean Club Championship fourth place vs. Caribbean Club Shield winner playoff

1 from the North American Zone:
1 club from  Canada

Winners

Statistics

See also
 CONCACAF Champions League
 Caribbean Club Championship
 Caribbean Club Shield
 Copa Interclubes UNCAF
 CONCACAF Cup Winners Cup
 CONCACAF Giants Cup
 Leagues Cup

References

External links
 Official website

 
CONCACAF club competitions
Multi-national association football leagues in North America
Sports leagues established in 2017
Sports leagues disestablished in 2022